Suresh Ganpati Halwankar is an Indian politician and member of the Bharatiya Janata Party. He is a two term member of the Maharashtra Legislative Assembly.

Constituency
Suresh Ganpati Halwankar was elected twice from the Ichalkaranji  assembly constituency, Maharashtra.

Positions held 
Maharashtra Legislative Assembly MLA.
General Secretary, BJP Maharashtra  
Terms in office: 2009-2014 and 2014–2019.

References 

Bharatiya Janata Party politicians from Maharashtra
Maharashtra MLAs 2014–2019
Living people
Maharashtra MLAs 2009–2014
Marathi politicians
1962 births